The 2000–01 Harvard Crimson women's ice hockey team represented Harvard University. During the 2000-01 season, Tammy Lee Shewchuk led the NCAA in assists per game with 1.48.

Player stats
Note: GP= Games played; G= Goals; A= Assists; PTS = Points; GW = Game Winning Goals; PPL = Power Play Goals; SHG = Short Handed Goals

Awards and honors
Jennifer Botterill, Patty Kazmaier Award
Tammy Lee Shewchuk, 2001 ECAC All-Tournament team
 Katey Stone repeated as the New England Hockey Writers Coach of the Year for the 2000-01 season.

Postseason

References

External links
Official Site

Harvard Crimson women's ice hockey seasons
Harvard
Har
Harvard Crimson women's ice hockey
Harvard Crimson women's ice hockey
Harvard Crimson women's ice hockey
Harvard Crimson women's ice hockey